Madison County is a county located in the Lead Belt region of the U.S. state of Missouri. As of the 2020 census, the population was 12,626. Its county seat and largest city is Fredericktown. The county was officially organized on December 14, 1818, and was named after President James Madison.

Mining has been a key industry in this area with Madison County recorded as having the oldest lead mine west of the Mississippi River.

Geography

Adjacent counties
St. Francois County (north)
Perry County (northeast)
Bollinger County (east)
Wayne County (south)
Iron County (west)

Major highways
 U.S. Route 67
 Route 72

National protected area
Mark Twain National Forest (part)

Demographics

As of the census of 2000, there were 11,800 people, 4,711 households, and 3,330 families residing in the county. The population density was 24 people per square mile (9/km2). There were 5,656 housing units at an average density of 11 per square mile (4/km2). The racial makeup of the county was 98.30% White, 0.13% Black or African American, 0.25% Native American, 0.29% Asian, 0.20% from other races, and 0.83% from two or more races. Approximately 0.56% of the population were Hispanic or Latino of any race.

There were 4,711 households, out of which 31.20% had children under the age of 18 living with them, 57.40% were married couples living together, 10.10% had a female householder with no husband present, and 29.30% were non-families. 25.90% of all households were made up of individuals, and 14.30% had someone living alone who was 65 years of age or older. The average household size was 2.46 and the average family size was 2.93.

In the county, the population was spread out, with 24.60% under the age of 18, 7.90% from 18 to 24, 26.30% from 25 to 44, 23.30% from 45 to 64, and 18.00% who were 65 years of age or older. The median age was 39 years. For every 100 females there were 92.10 males. For every 100 females age 18 and over, there were 87.70 males.

The median income for a household in the county was $30,421, and the median income for a family was $37,474. Males had a median income of $27,670 versus $15,909 for females. The per capita income for the county was $15,825. About 12.80% of families and 17.20% of the population were below the poverty line, including 22.60% of those under age 18 and 16.20% of those age 65 or over.

Religion
According to the Association of Religion Data Archives County Membership Report (2000), Madison County is a part of the Bible Belt with evangelical Protestantism being the majority religion. The most predominant denominations among residents in Madison County who adhere to a religion are Southern Baptists (37.87%), Independent/Non-Charismatic Churches (17.42%), and National Association of Free Will Baptists (12.10%).

2020 Census

Education
Of adults 25 years of age and older in Madison County, 68.6% possesses a high school diploma while 7.8% holds a bachelor's degree as their highest educational attainment.

Public schools
Fredericktown R-I School District - Fredericktown
Fredericktown Elementary School (PK-02)
Fredericktown Intermediate School (03-05)
Fredericktown Middle School (06-08)
Fredericktown High School (09-12)
Marquand-Zion R-VI School District - Marquand
Marquand-Zion Elementary School (K-06)
Marquand-Zion High School (07-12)

Private schools
Faith Christian Academy - Fredericktown

Public libraries
 Fredericktown Branch Library

Politics

Local
Both the Republican and Democratic parties split control of the local elected offices in Madison County.

State
All of Madison County is a part of Missouri's 145th District in the Missouri House of Representatives and is currently represented by Rick Francis (R-Perryville). The 156th District includes all of Bollinger and Madison counties as well as most of Perry County, Missouri.

All of Madison County is a part of Missouri's 27th District in the Missouri Senate and is currently represented by State Senator Holly Rehder (R-Scott City). The 27th Senatorial District includes all of Bollinger, Cape Girardeau, Madison, Mississippi, Perry and Scott counties.

Federal
Madison County is included in Missouri's 8th Congressional District and is currently represented by Jason T. Smith (R-Salem) in the U.S. House of Representatives. Smith won a special election on Tuesday, June 4, 2013, to finish out the remaining term of U.S. Representative Jo Ann Emerson (R-Cape Girardeau). Emerson announced her resignation a month after being reelected with over 70 percent of the vote in the district. She resigned to become CEO of the National Rural Electric Cooperative.

Political culture

Missouri presidential preference primary (2008)

In the 2008 Missouri Presidential Preference Primary, voters in Madison County from both political parties supported candidates who finished in second place in the state at large and nationally.

Former U.S. Senator Hillary Clinton (D-New York) received more votes (a total of 971) in Madison County during the 2008 primaries than any candidate from either party.

Communities

Cities
Fredericktown (county seat)

Town
Marquand

Villages
Cobalt
Junction City

Census-designated places
Cherokee Pass
Mine La Motte

Other unincorporated communities

 Allbright
 Buckhorn
 Catherine Place
 Cornwall
 Faro
 French Mills
 Hahns Mill
 Higdon
 Jewett
 Lance
 Millcreek
 Oak Grove
 Roselle
 Saco
 Saint Michel
 Silver Mine
 Tin Mountain
 Twelvemile
 Zion

See also
National Register of Historic Places listings in Madison County, Missouri

References

External links
 Digitized 1930 Plat Book of Madison County  from University of Missouri Division of Special Collections, Archives, and Rare Books

 
1818 establishments in Missouri Territory
Populated places established in 1818